King's Highway2, commonly referred to as Highway2, is the lowest-numbered provincially maintained highway in the Canadian province of Ontario, and was originally part of a series of identically numbered highways which started in Windsor, stretched through Quebec and New Brunswick, and ended in Halifax, Nova Scotia. Prior to the 1990s, Highway2 travelled through many of the major cities in Southern Ontario, including Windsor, Chatham, London, Brantford, Hamilton, Burlington, Mississauga, Toronto, Oshawa, Belleville, Kingston and Cornwall, amongst many other smaller towns and communities.

Once the primary east–west route across the southern portion of Ontario, most of Highway2 was bypassed by Highway 401, which was completed in 1968. The August 1997 completion of Highway 403 bypassed one final section through Brantford. Virtually all of the  length of Highway2 was deemed a local route and removed from the provincial highway system by January1, 1998, with the exception of a  section east of Gananoque. The entire route remains driveable, but as County Road2 or County Highway2 in most regions. In Toronto, former sections of the route are now Lake Shore Boulevard and Kingston Road.

Portions of what became Highway2 served as early settlement trails, post roads and stagecoach routes. While the arrival of the railroad in the mid-19th century diminished the importance of the route, the advent of the bicycle and later the automobile renewed interest in roadbuilding. A  segment of Highway2 between Pickering and Port Hope was the first section of roadway assumed by the newly-formed Department of Public Highways (DPHO) on August21, 1917. By the end of 1920, the department had taken over roads connecting Windsor with the Quebec boundary at Rivière-Beaudette, which it would number as Provincial Highway2 in the summer of 1925. In 1930, the DPHO was renamed the Department of Highways (DHO), and provincial highways became King's Highways.

The section of Highway2 between Hamilton and Toronto along Lakeshore Road became the first paved intercity road in Ontario in 1914. Beginning in the mid-1930s, the DHO began reconstructing several portions of the highway into the new German-inspired "dual highway", including east from Scarborough along Kingston Road. This would be the progenitor to Highway401, which was built in a patchwork fashion across Southern Ontario throughout the 1950s and early 1960s, often as bypass of and parallel to Highway2 (except between Woodstock and Toronto). Conversely, the importance of Highway2 for long-distance travel was all but eliminated, and coupled with the increasing suburbanization of the Greater Toronto Area, it became an urban commuter route between Hamilton and Oshawa.

Having being replaced in importance by the parallel freeways of Highway401, the Queen Elizabeth Way, and finally Highway403, the province gradually transferred sections of the route back to the municipal, county and regional governments that it passed through, a process known as downloading. In 1997 and 1998, the province downloaded  of Highway2 and rescinded dozens of Connecting Link agreements, reducing the route to its current length.

Route description 
Since 1998, Highway2 has remained in the provincial highway system solely as a connection between westbound Thousand Islands Parkway and eastbound Highway401. Highway2 begins at the eastern town limits of Gananoque, and travels east a short distance before gently curving northward. It meets an interchange with the Thousand Islands Parkway—once referred to as Highway2S,
prior to becoming a temporary part of Highway401 in 1952—and ends at the westbound Highway401 offramp (Exit648). The roadway continues as Leeds and Grenville County Road 2 both east and west of the highway.

Before 1997 
Before being mostly-decommissioned as a provincial highway in the mid-1990s, Highway2 was a continuous route from Highway 3 in Windsor to the Quebec border.
Prior to the arrival of Highway401 in the 1950s and early 1960s, Highway2 was the primary east–west route across the southern portion of Ontario.
At one time it connected with Quebec Route 2, which was renumbered in 1966 as multiple highways,
and onwards to New Brunswick Route 2 and Nova Scotia Trunk 2 to end in Halifax. New Brunswick reassigned Route2 to a new freeway running between Fredericton and Moncton in 2007,
while Nova Scotia kept its portion of Highway2 intact, numbering its bypass as Highway 102 and Highway 104.

In 1972, the Ontario and Quebec governments designated Highway/Route2 from Windsor to Rivière-du-Loup as the Heritage Highway (Route des Pionniers), a tourist route which continued eastward to the Gaspé Peninsula on what is now Quebec Route 132.
This tourist route included various side trips, such as highways to Ottawa and Niagara Falls.
While this signage is maintained in some counties, others have promoted local tours, including the Apple Route between Trenton and Brighton,
the Arts Route in Hastings County,
and the Chemin du Roy (The King's Way, now Route 138) between Montreal and Quebec City.

Windsor–Mississauga 
Within Ontario and prior to 1997, Highway2 began in Windsor at the interchange between the E. C. Row Expressway and Highway3 (Huron Church Road), where it also met the northern terminus of Highway 18. It followed the expressway east through Windsor, with the divided highway transitioning to an urban arterial road near Lesperance Road.
It travelled nearby the south shoreline of Lake St. Clair as it bisected Emeryville and Belle River before curving south briefly. It then turned east and travelled through a rural setting to Tilbury, where it met Highway401 at two interchanges (Exit56 and 63). Crossing from Essex County to Kent County, the highway curved northeast and passed through Chatham—where it intersected Highway 40—Louisville and Thamesville—where it intersected Highway 21—before entering Middlesex County near Bothwell—where it met Highway 79.

Between Chatham and Delaware, Highway2 travelled roughly parallel to and north of the Thames River. It passed through the communities of Wardsville, Strathburn—intersecting Highway 76 and Highway 80—and Melbourne before encountering an interchange with Highway 402 and crossing the Thames River. Within Delaware, the highway intersected Highway 81 and turned east. At Lambeth it met Highway 4 and the two highways travelled concurrent northeast into London. In downtown London, Highway2 and Highway4 parted at the intersection of York Street and Richmond Street, with Highway2 continuing east along the former. It intersected the northern end of Highway100, now known as the Veterans Memorial Parkway. While the route was south of the Thames River between Delaware and London, it continued east along Dundas Street between the two branches of the river between London and Woodstock, intersecting Highway 19 between the two in the community of Thamesford.

At Woodstock, Highway2 intersected Highway 59 and met Highway401 at an interchange near the split with Highway403. It then continued east, becoming parallel with the latter towards Hamilton. It intersected with Highway 53 at Eastwood and passed through the communities of Creditville, Gobles and Falkland before entering Paris. Within Paris, the highway intersected Highway 24A and met the western terminus of Highway 5, with which it remained within  through to Toronto. Highway2 branched southeast through Brantford, where it intersected Highway 24 and became concurrent with Highway53 before meeting the end of Highway403 at Cainsville; Highway 54 branched south from there.

Before 1997, Highway403 was discontinuous between Cainsville and Ancaster, intersecting and merging into Highway2 at both locations. The combined Highway2/53 travelled east through Alberton, before splitting at Duff's Corners. Highway2 split to the northeast, and Highway403 resumed at what is now Exit58. Highway2 then travelled through Ancaster, became concurrent with Highway 8 and entered into Hamilton. At Dundurn Street, the routes split, and Highway2 travelled north, now concurrent with Highway 6. The two routes split northeast of Burlington Bay, with Highway2 turning northeast into Burlington, encountering an interchange with the Queen Elizabeth Way. It then met Lakeshore Road, onto which the route turned and followed into Toronto. Lakeshore Road was aptly named for following the northwestern shores of Lake Ontario as it crossed through Oakville and Mississauga.

Toronto–Quebec 

At the Etobicoke Creek, Highway2 entered Etobicoke, one of the six municipalities in Metropolitan Toronto that amalgamated to form the present City of Toronto in 1998. At that point Lakeshore Road also transitioned to Lake Shore Boulevard. It intersected the southern end of Highway 27 and travelled through the community of New Toronto, where numerous motels flourished during the golden age of the automobile which have since given way to condominium development.
At Humber Bay, the route merged onto the Gardiner Expressway near Park Lawn Road, following it around the bay then through Downtown Toronto on an elevated roadway. Beyond the Don Valley Parkway interchange, the expressway descended to ground level, rejoining Lakeshore Boulevard near Leslie Street. It continued east before curving north at Woodbine Beach and becoming Woodbine Avenue (with the original route prior to the construction of the Gardiner and Lake Shore following three streets which are now partially or wholly absorbed into Lake Shore: Fleet, Cherry, and Keating Streets; as well as short sections of Leslie Street, Eastern Avenue, and Queen Street). It then turned northeast and followed Kingston Road into Scarborough.

Approaching the Highland Creek valley, Kingston Road split from Highway 2A at the Highland Creek Overpass, travelling parallel to and north of it as it transitioned into Highway401. Highway2 crossed the Rouge River into Pickering and Durham Region, initially alongside Highway401 before departing farther north. It bisected Pickering Village and passed through Ajax. Entering Whitby—where it intersected Highway 12 at Brock Street—Kingston Road became Dundas Street, while in Oshawa it became King Street. The Highway split into a one-way pairing within the latter, with westbound traffic following the adjacent Bond Street. It continued eastward through Courtice, Bowmanville and Newcastle as it drifted closer to Highway401 and Lake Ontario; an interchange with Highway 35/115 was encountered immediately west of Newcastle.

After passing through Newtonville, Highway2 entered Northumberland County, passing through the communities of Morrish and Welcome before turning southeast and crossing Highway401 into Port Hope and intersecting the southern end of Highway 28. It continued near the shoreline of Lake Ontario through the town of Cobourg, where it intersected the southern end of Highway 45, as well as the communities of Grafton, Wicklow, Colborne and Salem. At the town of Brighton, where it intersected the southern end of Highway 30, the highway entered Hastings County and moved inland from Lake Ontario. In Trenton, the route crossed the Trent–Severn Waterway, intersected Highway 33, and began to travel along the northern shoreline of the Bay of Quinte.

Continuing northeast, Highway2 passed south of CFB Trenton and through the community of Bayside before travelling through the city of Belleville, where it intersected both Highway 62 and Highway 37. After passing thorugh the communities of Shannonville and Marysville, it turned south and bisected the Tyendinaga Mohawk Territory. Highway2 turned east at an intersection with Highway 49 and travelled through Deseronto, after which it entered Lennox and Addington County. At Napanee, the highway met the southern terminus of Highway 41 then travelled through the communities of Morven, Odessa and Westbrook before entering Kingston.

Within Kingston, Highway2 followed Princess Street and intersected Highway 38 and Highway33, crossed the Cataraqui River and Rideau Canal on the La Salle Causeway, then intersected the southern end of Highway 15 near CFB Kingston. For the remainder of its length, the highway followed close to or along the northern shoreline of the St. Lawrence River. Travelling northeast from Kingston, Highway2 passed through the communities of Barriefield, Ravensview and Pitts Ferry before reaching Gananoque and intersected the southern terminus of Highway 32. By 1997, the portion of Highway2 between the interchanges at Exit648 east of Gananoque and Exit687 west of Brockville along Highway401 was maintained by the United Counties of Leeds and Grenville, serving the communities of Wilstead, Mallorytown and Butternut Bay. The highway intersected Highway 29 at Brockville, then passed through the communities of Maitland, Prescott and Johnstown, intersecting the southern end of Highway 16 at the latter. It passed through Cardinal, as well as the Lost Villages relocated towns of Iroquois, Morrisburg—where it intersected Highway 31—Ingleside and Long Sault before entering Cornwall. It met the southern terminus of Highway 138 and continued northeast through the communities of Glen Walter and Summerstown. At Lancaster—the final notable community along Highway2—the route met Highway 34, and shortly thereafter crossed into Quebec.

Current routes 
Despite being decommissioned as a provincial highway in the 1990s, almost the entirety of the former highway remains driveable, and is now maintained by the various counties, regions, and cities through which it passes. The various sections have the following designations, from west to east:

History 
Highway 2 was the first roadway assumed under the maintenance of the Department of Public Highways (today's Ministry of Transportation of Ontario). The  section from the Rouge River to Smith's Creek, now Port Hope, was inaugurated on August 21, 1917, as The Provincial Highway.

Footpaths 

The forerunners to Highway 2 are numerous paths constructed during the colonization of Ontario. While some portions may have existed as trails created by Indigenous peoples for hundreds of years, the first recorded construction along what would become Highway 2 was in late October 1793, when Captain Smith and 100 Queen's Rangers returned from carving The Governor's Road  through the thick forests between Dundas and the present location of Paris. John Graves Simcoe was given the task of defending Upper Canada (present day Ontario) from the United States following the American Revolution and with opening the territory to settlement. After establishing a "temporary" capital at York (present day Toronto), Simcoe ordered an inland route constructed between Cootes Paradise at the tip of Lake Ontario and his proposed capital of London. By the spring of 1794, the road was extended as far as La Tranche, now the Thames River, in London. In 1795, the path was connected with York. Asa Danforth Jr., recently immigrated from the United States, was awarded the task, for which he would be compensated $90 per mile.

Beginning on June 5, 1799, the road was extended eastwards. It was carved as far as Port Hope by December, and to the Trent River soon after. Danforth's inspector and acting surveyor general William Chewett declared the road "good" for use in the dead of winter, but "impassible" during the wet summers, when the path turned to a bottomless mud pit. He went on to suggest that rather than setting aside land for government officials which would never be occupied, the land be divided into  lots for settlers who could then be tasked with statute labour to maintain the path. Danforth agreed, but the province insisted otherwise and only four settlers took up residence along the road between Toronto and Port Hope;
like many other paths of the day, it became a quagmire.

Danforth's road did not always follow the same path as today's Kingston Road. Beginning near Victoria Park Avenue and Queen Street East, the road can be traced along Clonmore Drive, Danforth Road, Painted Post Drive, Military Trail and Colonel Danforth Trail. Other sections of the former roadway exist near Port Hope and Cobourg, as well as within Grafton. Otherwise the two roads more or less overlap until they reach the Trent River; beyond this point Danforth's road is continued (1802) on a more southern route to reach the Bay of Quinte at Stone Mills (now Glenora). As the route straying through Scarborough avoided many of the settlers who had taken up residence near the lake, Danforth's road was bypassed by 1814 by William Cornell and Levi Annis. The Cornell Road (as it was known for a short time) shortened the journey from Victoria Park to West Hill, but remained mostly impassible like Danforth's route to the north. Finally succumbing to increasing pressures, the government raised funds to straighten the road and extend it through Belleville to Kingston. The work was completed by 1817 and the road renamed The Kingston Road.

Downriver from Kingston, roads built along the St. Lawrence for War of 1812 military use became a popular means to avoid rapids on the river by travelling overland.

Stagecoach and mail road

The creation of a post road extended year-round communication which had already existed on the Chemin du Roy from Quebec City-Montreal westward, with the first stagecoaches reaching York (Toronto) in January 1817. This link proved economically vital to enterprises such as the Bank of Montreal, established 1817 with branches in Quebec, Montreal, Kingston and Toronto. The original coaches left Montreal every Monday and Thursday, arriving in Kingston two days later; the full Montreal-York run took a week.

As with earlier routes (such as the Danforth Road), coaching inns prospered in every wayside village as the stagecoaches made frequent stops for water, food or fresh horses.

The original York Road (from Kingston) aka Kingston Road (from York) was initially little more than a muddy horse path. In 1829, a ferry crossing on the Cataraqui River in Kingston was replaced by a draw bridge. In the 1830s, efforts were made by various toll road operators to macadamise the trail as a gravel stagecoach road. On one section between Cobourg and Port Hope the Cobourg Star on October 11, 1848, expressed "surprise and deep regret, that the Cobourg and Port Hope Road Company have placed a tollgate on their road, although only just gravelled" adding a week later "On Sunday night last, the Toll House and Gate on the Port Hope Road were burned to the ground. We regret to say that there is no doubt as to its having been done designedly as a very hard feeling has grown up against the Company, from their having exacted Toll before the road was properly packed. They might have known that no community would quietly submit to drive their teams and heavy loads through six inches of gravel and pay for the privilege. But we would not be understood to sanction the lawless proceeding which has taken place."

Despite these issues, this road would remain the principal means of winter travel until the Grand Trunk Railway connected Montreal and Toronto in 1856. As intercity traffic formerly carried by the various stagecoach operators migrated to the iron horse, stagecoach roads faded to primarily local importance, carrying regional traffic.

This changed as the 20th century and the invention of the motorcar quickly made evident a need for better roads in the young but growing Dominion. The macadamised Lake Shore Road between Toronto and Hamilton, in poor condition with ongoing erosion, was the first section to be upgraded with concrete. The Toronto–Hamilton Highway, proposed in 1914, was opened along the lakeshore in November 1917. The Cataraqui Bridge, a toll swing bridge, was replaced by the La Salle Causeway that same year.

In 1918, the province subsidised the county and municipal purchase of various former toll roads (Brockville-Prescott, Paris-Brantford, Cobourg-Port Hope and Cobourg-Baltimore) to be improved and incorporated into the provincial highway system. Later acquisitions included a road from Cobourg to Grafton. As the roads became publicly owned, toll gates were removed.

In 1925, the Galipeault Bridge and Taschereau Bridge, both adjacent to 1854 Grand Trunk Railway bridges which were the first fixed mainland links to Montreal, brought Route 2 onto Montreal Island.

Provincial highway 

Ontario has published an official highway map since at least 1923, an era when many provincial highways were still gravel or unimproved road. To accommodate the passenger cars of the Roaring Twenties, efforts to pave Ontario's roads had begun in earnest. The 1926 Official Road Map of Ontario boasted the "Highway from Windsor to the Quebec border, via London will all be paved at the end of the present year" and "a person will then be able to travel over 700 miles of pavement without a detour". Twenty-five years after the first provincial road improvement efforts, Ontario maps boastfully listed fifteen king's highways (numbered 2-17, as 1 and 13 were never assigned) and a growing network of county roads. While thousands of miles of dirt and gravel road still remained throughout the system, the steel rails which crossed the region now had a credible rival in southern Ontario.

Beginning in 1935, Highway Minister Thomas McQuesten applied the concept of a second roadway to several projects along Highway 2: a  stretch west of Brockville, a  stretch from Woodstock eastward, and a section between Birchmount Road to east of Morningside Avenue in Scarborough Township. When widening in Scarborough reached the Highland Creek ravine in 1936, east of Morningside, the Department of Highways began construction on a second bridge over the large valley (the original having been constructed as a bypass of the former alignment through West Hill in 1919). From here the highway was constructed on a new alignment to Oshawa, avoiding construction on the congested Highway 2. As grading and bridge construction neared completion between Highland Creek and Ritson Road in September 1939, World War II broke out and gradually money was siphoned from highway construction to the war effort.

The wartime rationing of the 1940s soon gave way to the fifties neon era of growing prosperity, increased vehicle ownership and annual paid vacations. Service stations, diners, motels and tourist-related establishments were proliferating on long strips of highway such as Toronto's Lakeshore Boulevard and Kingston Road to accommodate the growing number of travellers.

Increased traffic initially led to a construction boom, but soon the most congested sections were among the first candidates to be bypassed by freeway. By 1955, businesspeople along the north shore of Lake Erie were organising efforts to promote tourism on Highways 2 and 3, both of which stood to lose traffic upon the construction of Highway 401. In 1956, the 401 provided a continuous Toronto Bypass from Weston to Oshawa.

A portion of the highway in the area of Morrisburg was permanently submerged by the creation of the St. Lawrence Seaway in 1958. The highway was rebuilt along a Canadian National Railway right-of-way in the area to bypass the flooded region. The town of Iroquois was also flooded, but was relocated 1.5 kilometres north rather than abandoned. This event led to the nickname of The Lost Villages for a number of communities in the area.

Countless roadside motels from Windsor to Montreal were bypassed in the 1960s, with the 401 freeway completed in 1968. Growing hotel chains built new facilities near the 401 offramps, saturating the market in some areas. By the 1980s, Toronto's portion of the Kingston Road was in steep decline. Some motels were used to shelter homeless or refugee populations, others were simply demolished.

The section of Highway 2 between Woodstock and Ancaster (today a part of Hamilton) was not bypassed by 401 (which followed a more northerly corridor to serve Kitchener-Waterloo and Guelph), but was ultimately bypassed by Highway 403. As the main street in many communities Highway 2 remained busy with stop-and-go local traffic, sustaining countless shopkeepers and restaurateurs but offering little comfort to independent tourist motels. Outside urban areas, numerous former service stations were converted to other uses, demolished or abandoned.

The last section from Ancaster to Brantford, was bypassed on August 15, 1997. On January 1, 1998, most of the former length of Highway 2 was downloaded, transferring the highway from provincial responsibility to local counties or municipalities. The route lost its King's Highway designation in the process, along with much of its visibility on printed Ontario maps. Many Ontario highways which originally ended at Highway 2 (as the backbone of Ontario's highway system) were truncated or simply decommissioned, most often becoming county roads.

One token provincially maintained section of Highway 2 remains east of Gananoque; this section remains provincially maintained because the Thousand Islands Parkway does not have a complete interchange with Highway 401, meaning that some drivers must use the Highway 2 interchange to transfer between the two roads.

Major intersections 

The following table lists the major cities along Highway 2, as originally noted on mileage charts included with Ontario's official road maps. These 1920s figures are based on the original 544.5 mile routing through Aultsville and Moulinette, Ontario.

Various changes to the routing caused the length to vary between 540 and 544 miles between the initial paving of the highway in 1926 and its decertification in 1998. While the route remains drivable for its entire length, officially only a 1.1 km stub currently remains under provincial control.

See also 
 Heritage Highway

References
Footnotes

Bibliography

002
002
Transport in Cobourg
Ingersoll, Ontario
Transport in Quinte West
Roads in London, Ontario
Roads in Hamilton, Ontario
Roads in Mississauga
Transport in Brantford
Transport in Brockville
Transport in Burlington, Ontario
Roads in Chatham-Kent
Transport in Clarington
Transport in Cornwall, Ontario
Transport in Kingston, Ontario
Transport in Oakville, Ontario
Transport in Oshawa
Transport in Whitby, Ontario
Toronto highways
Transport in Woodstock, Ontario